The Trungpa tulku are a line of incarnate Tibetan lamas who traditionally head Surmang monastery complex in Kham, now Surmang. There have been twelve such Trungpa tulkus. They are members of the Karma Kagyu tradition as well as the Nyingma tradition.

Line of the Trungpa tulkus
 Künga Gyaltsen (15th century), student of Trungmase
 Künga Sangpo (born 1464)
 Künga Öser (15th and 16th centuries)
 Künga Namgyal (1567–1629)
 Tenpa Namgyal (1633–1712)
 Tendzin Chökyi Gyatso (1715–1761)
 Jampal Chökyi Gyatso (1763–1768)
 Gyurme Thenphel (born 1771)
 Tenpa Rabgye (19th century)
 Chökyi Nyinche (1879–1939)
 Chögyam Trungpa (Chökyi Gyamtso, 1940–1987) was one of the most influential teachers of Buddhism in the west. He is the founder of Shambhala Buddhism.
 Chökyi Sengay (Sengye/Senge, Choseng Trungpa, born February 6, 1989). Chokyi Sengay is the present Trungpa tülku.

Chökyi Nyinche 
According to Fabrice Midal, the tenth Trungpa tulku rejected his role as fundraiser for the Surmang monasteries and preferred to live as a disciplined meditation practitioner. At one point, to escape his duties as the figurehead of the monastery complex, he ran away on foot to study with Jamgon Kongtrul. He studied with Kongtrul Rinpoche for many years before returning to Surmang, and at that point had the reputation of a realized teacher. Dilgo Khyentse and the second Jamgon Kongtrul of Sechen studied with him. They later became the direct teachers of the eleventh Trungpa tulku.

Zurmang Lineage 
The Zurmang Kagyu lineage in Sikkim shares a common origin, but uses a different transliteration of the Tibetan ་ཟུར་མང. They claim Trungmase as the 1st Zurmang Gharwang Rinpoche lineage holder.

References 
 
 Midal, Fabrice (2004) Chögyam Trungpa: His Life and Vision 

Lamas
Tulkus
Religious leadership roles